The John Mordaunt Trust (JMT) was set up in 1996 to honour the memory of an influential AIDS activist.

Goals
The John Mordaunt Trust is an advocacy project set up to campaign for the health and human rights of ex/current injectors affected by HIV and other blood-borne infections (BBIs).

Background
John was deported from China alone as a result of his HIV status in 1986; when he had recovered from this trauma, he joined FRONTLINERS, the then People With AIDS Coalition UK, fighting hard for the human rights of other men, women and children affected by HIV/AIDS. Essentially John was a harm reduction activist, who began to speak out in the media of drugs-use as a human right, or at least that drugs users had the right NOT to be persecuted for their use of some substances.

As an ex-injection drug user (IDU), he was only too aware of how dangerous prohibition could be – risk of overdose deaths from unknown purity of drugs, fatal blood-borne infections from lack of access to clean injecting equipment, imprisonment, not to mention the collateral damage of crimes committed against others in desperate efforts to access illegal drugs day-in-day-out as well as violence related to drug-deals gone wrong. 

Harm reduction strategies are essential within current drug policy, as drugs users cannot and do not know the quality (therefore the dose) of the drugs they are buying. Harm reduction initially sprung out of the need to prevent AIDS in society, but has become a lot more. Its workers work in collaboration with drug users, trying to make sure they use drugs as safely as possible, thus keeping them as well as possible for as long as possible. Harm reduction accepts that people use drugs and commits to keeping people alive without demanding they stop using. That said, if people want to stop using, a harm reduction worker is only too willing to refer to the appropriate clinical service to help them reach that goal.

After his death Harm Reduction measures extended to some activists/workers being able to test the strength and quality of some drugs, particularly MDMA,  Ecstasy. Since 2018, the LOOP have been doing this work at Music Festivals and beyond, which inevitably means fewer people suffer any untoward effects of bad quality drugs. This testing also greatly reduces the likelihood of drug-related deaths
 
The John Mordaunt Trust keeps its members informed via a newsletter called The Users Voice.

Achievements
In June 1998, JMT's founder, Andria Efthimiou, (John's widow) arranged for the first ex-injector living with HIV+ - Marsha Burnett (RIP) to address the UN General Assembly Special Session on Drugs about the failures of Global Drug prohibition. Marsha was joined by Omarya Morales (RIP) a Columbian Cocalera, whose home had been burnt to the ground by US-driven coca eradication policies.

Supporting literature

Achieving the Aventis Science Prize shortlist 2005 is:

John Mordaunt (author) "Facing up to AIDS"
Publisher: O'Brien Pr
Publication date:	March 1, 1990

See also
 Demand reduction
 Prohibition (drugs)

References

External links
 the Users Voice

HIV/AIDS activists
Health advocacy groups